Maximilian Schönherr (born December 27, 1954) is a German journalist, musician, and photographer.

Life 
Schönherr was born on December 27, 1954, in Haßfurt, Bavaria, Germany.

After studying mathematics and physics at the Universities of Würzburg and Munich, he worked for Bavarian Broadcasting. In 1986, he received the Kurt-Magnus-Preis for Bit, byte, gebissen, the first series on computers on ARD radio, one of the most important radio awards in Germany. From 1987 to 1988, he traveled to Great Britain and the United States, as well as shorter stays in South Korea, Japan and China. Since 1995, he has worked regularly for Deutschlandfunk and Westdeutscher Rundfunk (WDR).

His contributions to Deutschlandfunk are Forschung aktuell, its saturday edition Computer und Kommunikation, and its sunday edition Wissenschaft im Brennpunkt, amongst other things.

Since 1987, he writes occasionally for the computer magazin c't. He has written several books on computer animation with Maya and in 2001/2002 had lectureships for visual communication at the FH Aachen and the Filmakademie Ludwigsburg.

Schönherr is also a musician and photographer as well as an author in the German Wikipedia since 2007 and later also in the English Wikipedia.

Awards
In 2008, Charité awarded Schönherr the media award „Medizin – Mensch – Technik“ for the radio feature „Smarties für die Prostata – IT-gestützte Visualisierungstechniken in der Medizin“. In 2009 and 2014, he received the Deutscher Hörbuchpreis for the best non-fiction.

Books 

 Die Moral ist gut im Land (Gedichte), Die Gießkanne 1976
 Maya 3. Ästhetik & Technik von High-End 3D-Animationen, Addison-Wesley 2000
 Maya 4 Sketches. 30 Tutorials in 3D, Addison-Wesley 2001
 Autodesk Maya – Die Referenz, Addison-Wesley 2005,

See also 

 SWR2 Archivradio

External links 

 Official website (in German)
 Maximilian Schönherr on SWR 2

References 

Living people
1954 births
German journalists
German musicians
German photographers